Gaia is an album by American jazz pianist Marilyn Crispell, which was recorded in 1987 and released on the English Leo label.

Reception

The Wire's 1988 critics poll listed Gaia as one of the best albums of that year. The editors wrote: "Named for the Greek Goddess of the Earth, GAIA affirms the power of the life-force in fierce, joyous music that is both sexual and spiritual..."

In his review for AllMusic, Thom Jurek states "Gaia is too fragmented to be marketed as a single work, its editing is sloppy and incoherent, and the improvising here - by a trio that would later stun live audiences with its empathy and near telepathic communication - is too stilted and rudimentary."

The Penguin Guide to Jazz says that "Gaia is one of the finest composition/improvisation records of the '80s, a hymn to the planet that is neither mawkish nor sentimental, but tough-minded, coherent and entire."

Track listing
All compositions by Marilyn Crispell
 "Gaia" – 39:40

Personnel
Marilyn Crispell – piano, harp, percussion
Reggie Workman - bass, drums, percussion
Doug James - drums, percussion

References

1988 albums
Marilyn Crispell albums
Leo Records albums